Nicholas James Henshall (born 6 April 1962) is a British Anglican priest and author, who served as Dean of Chelmsford from 2014 until 2023.

Early life and education 
Henshall was born on 6 April 1962 in Mossley, now in Greater Manchester, then in the County of Lancashire, England, where his father, Michael Henshall, was priest in charge. The family moved to Altrincham, a commuter town in south Manchester, on Michael's appointment as vicar of St George's.

Nicholas was educated at Manchester Grammar School when it was still a direct grant school and before it became independent, and remained living in Manchester after his parents moved to Liverpool with his father's appointment as David Shepherd's suffragan Bishop in 1976.

After leaving school Nicholas spent a year as an associate student at the British School of Archaeology in Athens, travelling widely in Greece and Turkey. He then returned to the UK to read Literae Humaniores (Classics) at Wadham College, Oxford (1980-1984). He spent a year in Rome working as the assistant to the Director of the Anglican Centre in Rome in the Palazzo Doria, returning to Oxford to read theology while training for ordination at Ripon College Cuddesdon (1985-1988).

Ordained ministry 

Nicholas was ordained deacon in 1988 and priest in 1989. in Newcastle Cathedral by Alec Graham, Bishop of Newcastle. He was curate of St Mary, Blyth 1988-1992, a former mining town on the north east coast of Northumberland. He was then  Vicar of St Margaret, Scotswood from 1992 to 2002. This was a community of multiple deprivation in the west end of Newcastle where the church played a major role in local community projects and regeneration. Nicholas chaired Scotswood Area Strategy over this time, employing 25 community workers in a wide range of regeneration projects. Following a deeply controversial decision by Newcastle City Council, most of the Scotswood estate was demolished, starting in 2000 and the residents dispersed across the city.

In 2002 Nicholas was appointed Canon Precentor of Derby Cathedral by Bishop Jonathan Bailey and the Very Revd Michael Perham Dean of Derby (later Bishop of Gloucester). His main roles included the development of the Cathedral’s worship and music and more widely in the Diocese. He also played a significant role in community networks and from 2003 presented the Sunday Breakfast Show on BBC Radio Derby, winning silver in the Frank Gillard awards.

Nicholas served as Vicar of Christ Church, Harrogate from 2008 to 2014, leading a large church community through a time of significant change, and holding a range of responsibilities in the Diocese of Ripon and Leeds. During his final year at Christ Church he served as acting Archdeacon of Richmond, supporting parishes and communities across a large part of North Yorkshire and working as part of the Bishop's Senior Staff.

In 2014 Nicholas was selected as the next Dean of Chelmsford by Stephen Cottrell (now Archbishop of York). He was instituted at Chelmsford Cathedral on 2 February 2014. Henshall resigned the Deanery in February 2023 to return to parish ministry; he was licensed to New Groombridge on 23 February (thereby vacating the deanery).

Publications 

 Chapter on marriage and priesthood in Priests in a People’s Church ed George Guiver (SPCK 2001)
 2008 – 2018: a series of 35 articles on pastoral and practical theology in The Tablet
 Focusses of Prophecy? Chapter in the book Holy Ground, ed Stephen Platten (2017 Sacristy Press) 
 Contributing editor of the second edition of “Dear Nicholas” by Michael Henshall (2019 Sacristy Press)

External links 
·        www.chelmsfordcathedral.org.uk

References

1.   ^ Publications include Holy Ground (Sacristy Press, 2017) and Dear Nicholas... (Sacristy Press, 2019)

2.   ^ Cathedral web-site

3.    ^ Jump up to:a b "Henshall, Nicholas James". Who's Who. ukwhoswho.com. 2016 (November 2015 online ed.). A & C Black, an imprint of Bloomsbury Publishing plc. Retrieved 24 July 2016. (subscription or UK public library membership required)

4.   ^ 

5.   ^ Ripon/Leeds Anglican

6.   ^ Chelmsford Anglican

7.   ^ Chelmsford Weekly News

8.   ^ Diocese of Chelmsford – Henshall appointed Dean (Accessed 15 November 2013)

1949 births
People from Mossley
People educated at Manchester Grammar School
Alumni of Wadham College, Oxford
Alumni of Ripon College Cuddesdon
Provosts and Deans of Chelmsford
Living people